The following notable people were born in or are associated with Janesville, Wisconsin.

Artists and performers 

Tim Davis, co-founder of The Steve Miller Band
Gloria Foster, actress
Karron Graves, actress
Carrie Jacobs-Bond, songwriter
Tad Kubler, guitarist for The Hold Steady
Kerwin Mathews, actor
Manilla Powers, singer, Vaudeville performer, musical theater comedian
Leoni W. Robinson, architect
Tom Welling, actor (lived in Janesville briefly during childhood)
Ella Wheeler Wilcox, poet

Athletes 

Mistie Bass (Mistie Williams), WNBA player
Frank Bliss, MLB player
Tommy Cronin, NFL player
Moxie Dalton, NFL player
Stan Fox, race car driver, eight-time starter at the Indianapolis 500
Tucker Fredricks, Olympic speedskater
Fred Hayner. baseball player
Larry Hough, Olympic rower
Paul Janus, NFL player
Travis Kvapil, NASCAR driver
John Morrissey, professional baseball player
Tom Morrissey, professional baseball player
Joe Riggert, MLB player
Terry Ryan, MLB manager
Peter Shorts, NFL player
Bob Strampe, MLB player
Luke Hanewall, professional disc golfer

Military personnel 

Leslie Allen Bellrichard, Medal of Honor recipient, Vietnam
James Bintliff, Union Army general
Victor Bleasdale, Navy Cross and Distinguished Service Cross recipient
Frank Matteson Bostwick, U.S. Navy Commodore
James E. Croft, Medal of Honor recipient, Civil War
Gerald L. Endl, Medal of Honor recipient, World War II
Theodore W. Goldin, Medal of Honor recipient, American Indian Wars
John Johnson, Medal of Honor recipient, Civil War
John E. McCoy, U.S. Air National Guard general
Henry Palmer, Union Army general
James Pond, Medal of Honor recipient, Civil War
Thomas H. Ruger, Civil War general and military governor of Georgia under occupation
Claron A. Windus, Medal of Honor recipient

Politicians 

C. S. Amsden, South Dakota State Representative and Senator
William A. Barstow, Governor of Wisconsin, Union Army general
Harry W. Bolens, Wisconsin State Senator
William B. Britton, Wisconsin State Representative
James H. Budd, Governor of California
Stephen Bolles, U.S. Representative
Zebulon P. Burdick, Wisconsin State Senator
Bob Carr, U.S. Representative from Michigan
Peter P. Carr, Wisconsin State Senator
John B. Cassoday, Chief Justice of the Wisconsin Supreme Court
Harmon Sweatland Conger, U.S. Representative from New York
Dave Considine, educator and Wisconsin State Representative
Tim Cullen, Wisconsin State Senator
Joseph Doe, U.S. Assistant Secretary of War
Russ Feingold, U.S. Senator
Edwin G. Fifield, Wisconsin State Representative
Alexander Graham, New York and Wisconsin State Representative
Gilbert N. Haugen, U.S. Representative from Iowa
Fenner Kimball, Wisconsin State Representative
James H. Knowlton, Wisconsin State Representative
Debra Kolste, Wisconsin State Representative
Don L. Love, Mayor of Lincoln, Nebraska
Allen P. Lovejoy, Wisconsin State Senator
William A. Lawrence, Wisconsin State Representative and Senator
David W. Márquez, Alaska Attorney General
Alexander E. Matheson, Wisconsin State Representative and jurist
Max Maxfield, Wyoming Secretary of State
Hiram Merrill, Wisconsin State Representative
Cyrus Miner, Wisconsin State Representative
David Noggle, Wisconsin State Representative, Chief Justice of the Supreme Court of the Idaho Territory
Thomas S. Nolan, Wisconsin State Representative
Pliny Norcross, Mayor of Janesville and Wisconsin State Representative
Andrew Palmer, Wisconsin State Senator
Henry A. Patterson, Wisconsin State Representative
Anson W. Pope, Wisconsin State Representative
Steve Preston, U.S. Secretary of Housing and Urban Development
Paul Ryan, Speaker of the U.S. House of Representatives
Michael J. Sheridan, former speaker of the Wisconsin State Assembly
Ithamar C. Sloan, U.S. Representative from Wisconsin
A. Hyatt Smith, politician and businessman
E. Ray Stevens, Justice of the Wisconsin Supreme Court
James Sutherland, Wisconsin State Senator
George Tarrant Sr., Wisconsin State Representative
Henry Tarrant, Wisconsin State Representative
Howard Teasdale, Wisconsin State Senator
Alexander McDonald Thomson, former Speaker of the Wisconsin State Assembly
Charles L. Valentine, Wisconsin State Representative
William G. Wheeler, Wisconsin State Representative and U.S. Attorney
John Meek Whitehead, Wisconsin State Senate
Edward V. Whiton, Chief Justice of the Wisconsin Supreme Court
Charles G. Williams, U.S. Representative
George H. Williston, Wisconsin territorial and state legislator
Agesilaus Wilson, Wisconsin State Representative
Wayne W. Wood, Wisconsin State Representative
Edwin E. Woodman, Wisconsin State Senator

Other 

David Adamany, president of Temple University
John Henry Comstock, entomologist
Jim Fitzgerald, former owner of the Milwaukee Bucks and the Golden State Warriors
Lavinia Goodell, first woman licensed to practice law in Wisconsin
William Goodell, abolitionist
Joseph Dutton, Civil War veteran and later missionary to the lepers of Molokai
Ken Hendricks, Forbes 400 businessman
Jenkin Lloyd Jones, Unitarian minister and magazine editor
Walter Lees, early aviator
Mary Kimball Morgan (1861–1948), American educator and college president
George S. Parker, founder of the Parker Pen Company
Frances Willard, educator and activist (raised and first taught here)
Daniel Hale Williams, African-American surgeon and heart surgery pioneer, raised and first employed here

References 

Janesville, Wisconsin
Janesville
Janesville, Wisconsin